Below is a list of National Amateur Boxing Featherweight Champions, also known as United States Amateur Champions, along with the state or region which they represented.  The weight class was contested at 125 pounds between 1889 and 1921. It was then contested at 126 pounds between 1922 and 1951, before returning to 125 pounds in 1952; which it is currently contested at.  The United States National Boxing Championships bestow the title of United States Amateur Champion on amateur boxers for winning the annual national amateur boxing tournament organized by USA Boxing, the national governing body for Olympic boxing and is the United States' member organization of the International Amateur Boxing Association (AIBA).  It is one of four premier amateur boxing tournaments, the others being the National Golden Gloves Tournament, which crowns its own amateur featherweight champion, the Police Athletic League Tournament, and the United States Armed Forces Tournament, all sending champions to the US Olympic Trials.  

1889 - J. Brown, New York, New York (spring); J. Gorman, SAC (winter)
1890 - J. Schneering, New York, New York
1891 - W.H. Horton, Navy
1892 - Not held
1893 - W.H. Horton, Navy
1894 - C. Miner, CAC
1895 - L. Campbell, Pittsburgh, Pennsylvania
1896 - Not held
1897 - Joe McCann, Philadelphia, Pennsylvania
1898 - Not held
1899 - John Burns, New York, New York
1900 - John Scholes, Toronto, Ontario, Canada
1901 - John Scholes, Toronto, Ontario, Canada
1902 - Joe McCann, Philadelphia, Pennsylvania
1903 - J. McGarry, Mott Haven AC
1904 - T.J. Fitzpatrick, Boston, Massachusetts
1905 - Willie Cornell, Lowell, Massachusetts
1906 - W.J. Leonard, San Francisco, California
1907 - T.J. Fitzpatrick, Boston, Massachusetts
1908 - E.J. Walsh, New York, New York
1909 - T.J. Fitzpatrick, Boston, Massachusetts
1910 - Frank Smith, Boston, Massachusetts
1911 - Frank Hufnagie, Brooklyn, New York
1912 - John Cooper, Chelsea, Massachusetts
1913 - Walter Hitchen, Toronto, Ontario, Canada
1914 - V. Pokorni, Cleveland, Ohio
1915 - Art Strawhacker, Cleveland, Ohio
1916 - William Morris, New York, New York
1917 - Earl Baird, Seattle, Washington
1918 - James Fruzetti, Brockton, Massachusetts
1919 - W.P. Corbett, Somerville, Massachusetts
1920 - Solly Seeman, Brooklyn, New York
1921 - Dan Gartin, Philadelphia, Pennsylvania
1922 - George Fifield, Toronto, Ontario, Canada
1923 - Terry Parker, Boston, Massachusetts
1924 - Joe Salas, Los Angeles, California
1925 - Ray Alfano, St. Louis, Missouri
1926 - Patsy Rufalo, New York, New York
1927 - Christopher Battalino, Hartford, Connecticut
1928 - Harry Devine, Waltham, Massachusetts
1929 - Martin Zuniga, Los Angeles, California
1930 - Ray Meyers, New York, New York
1931 - Anthony Sarpati, New York, New York
1932 - Richard Carter, New York, New York
1933 - Louis Barisano, Boston, Massachusetts
1934 - Ed Waling, Highland Park, Michigan
1935 - Al Nettlow, River Rouge, Michigan
1936 - Joseph Church, Buffalo, New York
1937 - Ed Waling, Detroit, Michigan
1938 - Bill Eddy, Flint, Michigan
1939 - Bill Eddy, Flint, Michigan
1940 - Frank Robinson, Pittsburgh, Pennsylvania
1941 - 
1942 -
1943 -
1944 - Major Jones, Kansas City, Missouri
1945 - Virgil Franklin, Oklahoma City, Oklahoma
1946 - Leo Kelly, Pittsburgh, Pennsylvania
1947 - Wallace (Bud) Smith, Cincinnati, Ohio
1948 - T. Fittipaldo, Warren, Ohio
1949 - Benny Apostadiro, Honolulu, Hawaii
1950 - Sammy Rodgers, Baltimore, Maryland
1951 - Len Walters, Vancouver, British Columbia, Canada
1952 - Mac Martinez, San Jose, California
1953 - Bob Tenequer, Lawton, Oklahoma
1954 - Stan Fitzgerald, Buffalo, New York
1955 - Joe Charles, Air Force
1956 - Jim Pettaway, Toledo, Ohio
1957 - Rubin Pizzarro, New York, New York
1958 - John Patrick Britt, Philadelphia, Pennsylvania
1959 - Roy Houpe, Columbus, Ohio
1960 - George Foster, Cincinnati, Ohio
1961 - Ralph Ungricht, Provo, Utah
1962 - Steve Freeman, Houston, Texas
1963 - Victor Baerga, New York, New York
1964 - Charles Smith, Air Force
1965 - Lawrence Hines, Philadelphia, Pennsylvania
1966 - R. Lozado, Camp Lejeune, North Carolina
1967 - Roy DeFilippis, San Diego, California
1968 - George McGarvey, Washington, DC
1969 - Joe Bennett, Joliet, Illinois
1970 - Ray Lunny III, San Francisco, California
1971 - Ricky Boudreaux, New Orleans, Louisiana
1972 - Jerome Artis, Philadelphia, Pennsylvania
1973 - Howard Davis Jr., Glen Cove, New York
1974 - Michael Hess, Portland, Oregon
1975 - Davey Lee Armstrong, Tacoma, Washington
1976 - Davey Lee Armstrong, Tacoma, Washington
1977 - Johnny Bumphus, Nashville, Tennessee
1978 - Elichi Jumawan, Wahiawa, Hawaii
1979 - Bernard Taylor 
1980 - Clifford Gray, Boynton Beach, Florida
1981 - Guadalupe Suarez, Corpus Christi, Texas
1982 - Orlando Johnson, Chicago, Illinois (spring), Clifford Gray, Boynton Beach, Florida (winter)
1983 - Andrew Minsker, Portland, Oregon
1984 - Lyndon Walker, Washington, DC
1985 - Runnell Doll, Army
1986 - Kelcie Banks, Chicago, Illinois
1987 - Kelcie Banks, Chicago, Illinois
1988 - Carl Daniels, St. Louis, Missouri
1989 - Frank Peña, Aurora, Colorado
1990 - Oscar De La Hoya, Los Angeles, California
1991 - Ivan Robinson, Philadelphia, Pennsylvania
1992 - Julian Wheeler, Navy
1993 - Julian Wheeler, Navy
1994 - Frank Carmona, Los Angeles, California
1995 - Floyd Mayweather Jr., Grand Rapids, Michigan
1996 - Augie Sanchez, Los Angeles, California
1997 - Jason Ingwaldson, Glendora, California
1998 - Michael Evans 
1999 - Rocky Juarez, Houston, Texas
2000 - Rocky Juarez, Houston, Texas
2001 - Andre Dirrell, Flint, Michigan
2002 - Johnny Vasquez Jr., Snyder, Texas
2003 - Aaron Garcia, Vista, California
2004 - Brandon Ríos Garden City, Kansas
2005 - Mark Davis, Cleveland, Ohio
2006 - Mark Davis, Cleveland, Ohio
2007 - Raynell Williams, Cleveland, Ohio
2008 - Robert Rodriguez
2009 - Kevin Rivers
2010 - Joseph Diaz Jr., Elmonte, California
2011 - Joseph Diaz Jr., Elmonte, California
2012 - Joet Gonzalez, Glendora, California
2013 - Gary Antonio Russell (with headgear), Eduardo Martinez (without headgear)
2014 - JaRico O'Quinn
2015 - Christopher Colbert
2016 - Duke Ragan
2017 - Duke Ragan
2018 - Duke Ragan

References
History

Feather